Original Productions, LLC is a television production company based in Burbank, California. It was founded in 1999 by Thom Beers.

Background
It is best known for producing reality television shows for the Discovery Channel but has more recently produced shows for other networks such as History, truTV, and Spike.

Some of its most popular shows are Deadliest Catch, Ice Road Truckers, Ax Men, and 1000 Ways to Die. Its earlier hit was Monster Garage.

History

Thom Beers founded Original Productions in 1999, when Discovery asked him to produce the two-hour special Extreme Alaska.

On February 19, 2009, FremantleMedia acquired 75% of Original Productions for $50 million.

On June 14, 2012, Beers launched a digital platform Original Productions Entertainment Networks that will feature his library. Philip D. Segal and Gayle Gilman were tapped to run the new venture. Later on August 29, 2012, Beers was promoted as CEO of FremantleMedia North America.

Television series
 1000 Ways to Die
 Alien Encounters
 Alaska Off-Road Warriors
 America's Port
 America's Toughest Jobs
 American Hoggers
 Are You Tougher Than a Boy Scout?
 Ax Men
 Backyard Nation
 Ballroom Bootcamp
 Beach PD
 Bering Sea Gold, aka Gold Divers
 Bering Sea Gold: Under The Ice
 Big!
 Biker Build-Off
 Black Gold
 Boom
 The Building
 Coal
 The Colony
 The Con Game
 Dead Tenants
 Deadliest Catch
 Deadliest Catch: Bloodline
 Deadliest Sea (TV movie)
 Disappeared
 Dog Brothers
 Fugitive Strike Force
 Holiday Madness
 Ice Road Truckers
 Iditarod: Toughest Race on Earth
 L.A. Hard Hats
 Lobstermen: Jeopardy at Sea
 Lobster Wars
 The Messengers
 Milk Carton Kids
 Monster Garage
 Monster House
 Monster Nation
 Motorcycle Women
 Ocean Force
 Plastic Surgery Before and After
 Raw Nature
 Resolutionaries
 Skyscraper Special
 Storage Wars
 Storage Wars: New York
 Storage Wars: Texas
 Swords
 Tattoo Wars
 Twister Sisters
 Verminators
 Whisker Wars
 Wing Nuts

References

External links
 Official site

Television production companies of the United States
Mass media companies established in 1999
RTL Group
1999 establishments in California